Beranci is a village in the municipality of Mogila, North Macedonia.

Etymology 
The village is first mentioned as Beranci in 1468, in Ottoman documents. It is believed that the name derives from the personal name, Beran. According to the legend, the first settler was someone named Beran (or Beron) from the village of Vevčani, near Struga, attempting to escape Turkish brutality.

Geography 
The village is situated in Pelagonia, in the northern part of the Bitola valley, and the western part of the Municipality of Mogila. The village is at an altitude of 640 meters. It is situated 17 km from Bitola.

The surrounding villages are Dolno Srpci, Vašarejca and Mogila.

History 

In Beranci and its surroundings, there are a number of important archeological findings. Gradište is located west of the village, with the locals claiming that it is a mound with valleys. Old money, tiles, large peaks and bricks were found at the site.

The location of Visoi is located where the villages of Beranci, Mogila and Crnobuki meet. A 1954 study unearthed old graves lined up in a circle, with Roman inscriptions being unearthed, and pottery being found inside the tombs.

The church of Saint Athanasius is located in the upper half of the village, in which it is believed that an ancient necropolis is located. The current monastery of Saint John the Baptist, is built on the ruins of the older monastery.

In the 19th century, Beranci was under the Manastir Vilayer of the Ottoman Empire.

Economy 
The area covers an area of 19 km2. It is dominated by arable land with an area of 1,028.3 hectares, with pastures occupying 785.5 hectares, and forests only 15 hectares.

The main function of the village concerns farming and livestock.

Demographics 
According to the 1467-68 Ottoman defter, Beranci appears as being almost exclusively inhabited by a Christian Albanian population. Some families had a mixed Slav-Albanian anthroponomy - usually a Slavic first name and an Albanian last name or last names with Albanian patronyms and Slavic suffixes.

Names of the heads of families: Gjini Arbanas, Pavel son of Gjin, Gjergji son of Dank, Gjergji son of Gjon, Gjergji son of Nino, Stala son of Gjin-ko, Nikolla son of Stale (Gjinko), Tom-i son of Bojo, Tom Siroma (poor), Tan-o son of Niko.

According to the 2002 census, the village had a total of 445 inhabitants. Ethnic groups in the village include:

Macedonians 445

Families 

Beranci is a Macedonian Orthodox village, with there only being one native family, with the rest being settlers.

The families of Beranci are:

 Natives: Ralevci; it is said they have lived in Beranci for a long time.
 Settlers: Pecevci, descend from their ancestor Pece, who came to Beranci from the surroundings of Debar in the 18th century; Popovci, a branch of the family Pecevci; Bojovci, settled from a village in Mariovo; Nikolovci, are a branch of the family Bojovci; Veljanovci, settled from the neighbouring Dolno Srpci; Jazevci, settled from a village in Mariovo; Gajdovci, are a branch of the Jazevci family; Gargovci, are descended from a man who married into the family Pecevci, Ljakovci, Kumbulovci, Bočkarovci, and Gjakovci, are settlers from unknown places, the family Ruškić was established by a policeman who came from Negotin in Serbia in 1919; and Damjanovci, settled from the village Virovo, near Demir Hisar in 1955.

Cultural and natural sights 

 Archeological findings

 Visoi — iron time tumulus
 Voden Dol — necropolis from Roman times
 Grabečka Reka — settlement from ancient and Roman times
 Gradište — settlement from late-antiquity;
 Ženski Dol — necropolis from late-antiquity
 Ploči — settlement and necropolis from Roman times
 Ristov Kladenec — necropolis from late-antiquity
 Crkvište — necropolis from early-ancient times
 Šukalovec — settlement from Roman times

 Churches

 Church of St. Athanasius — main church
 Church of St. John the Baptist — monasterial church
 Church of St. Constantine and Helena — new church

 Monasteries

 Beranci Monastery — an old monastery

Notable residents 
 Born in Beranci

 Vele Mačkarov — a village voivoda of IMRO, participated in the defence of the Kruševo Republic in the division of Pitu Guli.

Descent from Beranci
Alexander Volkanovski — a UFC champion. Born in Australia. His father was born in Beranci.

Emigration 
It is known about the following emigrant families from the village: Karovci in Dragožani; Pishmanovci  in Ivanjevci; Zajkovci, Minovci and Veljanchevci in Dolno Srpci; Gjakovci and Jazevci in Mogila; Kovačevci in Dobromiri and Nečovci in Kravari.

Over a 1000 people have emigrated from the village. The greater part of them live in Bitola, Prilep and Skopje, with some emigrating to the anglosphere and Europe.

References

Villages in Mogila Municipality